Porthcawl Town Athletic F.C. is a Welsh football club based in the seaside town of Porthcawl in south Wales. The first team currently play in the South Wales Alliance League, Premier Division.

The club has first, reserve and third teams as well as junior teams ranging from under sevens to under eighteens.

The club were promoted to the Premier Division at the end of the 2019–19 season finishing as champions of Division One.

Reserves and third teams
The reserves and third teams both play in the Port Talbot Reserve League, with the reserves managed by Tom Warren, and the thirds managed by Peter Gillet.

Mental Health Team 
The club merged in Summer 2020 with Mental Health and disabled club South Wales Spartans, to building Porthcawl Town Spartans MAFC.
.

Honours

South Wales Alliance League Division One – Champions: 2018–19

References

External links
Club website

Porthcawl
Football clubs in Wales
Association football clubs established in 2010
2010 establishments in Wales
South Wales Alliance League clubs
South Wales Senior League clubs
Football clubs in Bridgend County Borough